Yuzana Company Limited is a Burmese company involved in the construction, agriculture, hospitality, real estate and fishery industries.

Yuzana Company was established in 1994 by Htay Myint, a businessman with close ties to Khin Nyunt, a former Burmese prime minister and Than Shwe, the former head of the country's military junta. Yuzana began as a fisheries venture in Myeik (Mergui) in Southern Burma's Taninthayi Division. Yuzana Company also owns palm oil, sugarcane, teak, physic nut (Jatropha curcas), and rubber plantations.

Yuzana is one of Burma's largest producers of lahpet (pickled tea leaves), a national dish.

Yuzana is also one of four indigenous Burmese companies that harvests marine shrimps, in a  farm.

Projects

In 1994, Yuzana Company opened one of Burma's largest shopping centers, Yuzana Supermarket, in Rangoon. In 1997, it opened Yuzana Hotel, a 198-room hotel in Rangoon. In the 1990s, the company constructed Yuzana Garden City, a suburban housing development in Rangoon.

In 2007, Yuzana Company was awarded a build-operate-transfer government contract to redevelop the  Stilwell Road, which linked northeast India and China during World War II and collect toll and tax fees for 30 years.

In November 2010, Yuzana Company opened a  tapioca powder factory in Kachin State, near the company's plantations in the Hukawng Valley. The factory is reported to be the largest in Southeast Asia.

In 2011, Yuzana Company was named as one of the subcontractors for a major development project, to establish a special economic zone in Dawei.

Tourism
Yuzana Company currently operates three hotels in Myanmar:
Yuzana Hotel - Bahan Township, Yangon
Yuzana Garden Hotel - Mingala Taungnyunt Township, Yangon
Yuzana Resort Hotel - Ngwesaung

Controversy
Yuzana Company, as well as its founder Htay Myint, are currently subject to American investment sanctions.

The company has received preferential government loans to subsidize financially unsound projects.

Land confiscation and habitat destruction

That year, the Burmese government granted Yuzana Company a land concession to develop an agricultural development zone in Kachin State's Hukawng Valley (much of it in the Hukawng Valley Tiger Reserve), in Danai and Hpakant Townships. Within the boundaries of the land concession were seven villages that housed approximately 5,000 farmers.

The company has razed forests and destroyed animal corridors in the world's largest tiger reserve. In 2011, Kachin News Group, an ethnic news organization reported that the Burmese military had been stockpiling weapons in Yuzana Company's crop plantations in the Hukawng Valley.

In July 2012, Yuzana Company was named as one of the perpetrators involved in illegal farmland seizures (initially part of a contract farming scheme) in Yangon Region's Dagon Seikkan and East Dagon Townships.

References

Conglomerate companies of Myanmar
Holding companies established in 1994
1994 establishments in Myanmar